Vera Houghton, Baroness Houghton of Sowerby,   (née Travis; 18 October 1914 – 30 November 2013) was a British women's health campaigner, chair of the Abortion Law Reform Association and founder of the Birth Control Trust. She also served as a Vice President of the British Eugenics Society from 1964–1966 and again in 1969 when it was reformed as the Galton Institute.

Early life
Goughton was born in London on 18 October 1914 and educated at Haberdashers' Aske's School for Girls, Acton.

Career
She was the chair of the Abortion Law Reform Association from 1963 
to 1970, whilst the organisation, lobbied, sponsored and steered the Abortion Act 1967 through parliament. Following this, she continued to campaign for women's reproductive rights by founding the Birth Control Trust, which pushed for universally free contraceptives. She also became active in the Family Planning Association, becoming its chair in 1973, with birth control becoming free available on the NHS in 1974. She also became executive secretary of the International Planned Parenthood Federation from 1953 to 1959. In 1986, she was appointed a CBE.

Personal life
In 1939, she married Douglas Houghton, the founder and general secretary of the Association of Officers for Taxes, where she had worked since 1934.

References

1914 births
2013 deaths
Houghton of Sowerby
Commanders of the Order of the British Empire
People from Acton, London
People educated at Haberdashers' Girls' School
British eugenicists
British abortion-rights activists
Spouses of life peers